Calvin Levels (born September 30, 1954 in Cleveland, Ohio) is an American film actor. In 1984, he won a Theatre World Award and was nominated for both the Tony Award for Best Performance by a Leading Actor in a Play and the Drama Desk Award for Outstanding Featured Actor in a Play for his portrayal of Calvin Jefferson in Open Admissions. Levels is known for his roles in the films The Atlanta Child Murders (1985), Adventures in Babysitting (1987), Johnny Suede (1991), and Hellbound (1994).

Filmography

References

External links
 

1954 births
20th-century American male actors
African-American male actors
American male film actors
American male television actors
Living people
Male actors from Cleveland
Theatre World Award winners
20th-century African-American people
21st-century African-American people